Neurozerra flavicera is a moth in the family Cossidae. It was described by Hua, Chou, Fang and Chen in 1990. It is found in China (Guangdong).

References

Natural History Museum Lepidoptera generic names catalog

Zeuzerinae
Moths described in 1990